Kseniya Leonidovna Moskvina (born May 29, 1989) is a Russian swimmer, who specialized in backstroke events. She finished fourteenth in the 100 m backstroke at the 2008 Summer Olympics, and eclipsed a European record (56.36) to claim the gold medal at the  2009 European Short Course Championships in Istanbul, Turkey, apart from two of her bronze medals obtained in the 50 m backstroke, and 4 × 100 m medley relay.

Moskvina competed for the Russian team in two swimming events at the 2008 Summer Olympics in Beijing. Leading up to the Games, she finished with the second-place time in 1:00.95 to assure her direct selection to the Olympic team and clear the FINA A-cut (1:01.70) by almost a full second at the Russian Open Championships in Moscow. In the 100 m backstroke, Moskvina missed the top eight final with a thirteenth-place time in 1:01.06. Swimming in heat six on the evening prelims, Moskvina put up a tremendous effort from lane one with a blazing 1:00.70 to seal the last seed of the top 16 semifinal roster.

On the last day of the competition, Moskvina earned a fifth-place finish as a member of the Russian team in the 4 × 100 m medley relay with a final time of 3:57.84. Swimming the lead-off backstroke leg in the prelims, Moskvina produced a split of 1:01.05 to receive the Russian foursome of Anastasia Aksenova, Yuliya Yefimova, and Natalya Sutyagina a fifth seed en route to the final in 3:59.66.

On March 14, 2013, Moskvina was ordered a six-year ban by the Russian Swimming Federation for committing a second doping violation.

References

External links
NBC Olympics Profile

1989 births
Living people
Olympic swimmers of Russia
Swimmers at the 2008 Summer Olympics
Russian female backstroke swimmers
Sportspeople from Chelyabinsk
Russian sportspeople in doping cases
Doping cases in swimming
Universiade medalists in swimming
Universiade bronze medalists for Russia
Medalists at the 2009 Summer Universiade